The Primavera Sound 2022 music festival was held on 2 June to 12 June 2022 at Parc del Fòrum, in Barcelona and Sant Adrià del Besòs, Spain. After a two year hiatus due to social distancing restrictions during the COVID-19 pandemic, the festival returned in 2022 in a new two-weekend format, doubling the capacity of years before. In between weekends Primavera a la Ciutat took place in different concert venues and clubs in downtown Barcelona, featuring many performances including 100 Gecs, Boy Pablo, Rina Sawayama and King Gizzard & the Lizard Wizard. The twentieth edition of Primavera Sound was considered an Event of Exceptional Public Interest by the Government's Ministry of Culture and Sports.

The festival’s artist line-up included Beck, Dua Lipa, Gorillaz, Interpol, Jorja Smith, Lorde, Megan Thee Stallion, Nick Cave and the Bad Seeds, Phoenix, Tame Impala, The National, The Strokes, Tyler, the Creator and Yeah Yeah Yeahs. Antònia Font and Pavement, who also served as headliners, reunited for their first concerts since 2013 and 2010 respectively.

The event was marked by its diverse lineup and initial organisational difficulties, as well as the notable tensions between the City Council of Barcelona and co-director Gabi Ruiz about a possible relocation to Madrid. Despite initial controversies, resolutions came forward by increasing staff members and flowing communication with Mayor Ada Colau, who agreed to expand the festival's contract with the city until 2027.

Around 460,500 people attended the festival in seven days, 65% of whom were foreign, and a large proportion of these were from the United Kingdom. The festival had a significant economic impact, with each spectator spending an estimated average of 1,423 euros. Several Barcelonian independent record stores and NGOs also had representation at the festival.

Background 
The initial lineup for the twentieth edition of Primavera Sound was announced in January 2020.The 2020 lineup included headliners like Lana del Rey, Massive Attack, The National, King Princess, Young Thug, Brockhampton, The Strokes, Kacey Musgraves, Tyler, the Creator and Bad Bunny. However, due to social agrupation restrictions imposed by the Generalitat de Catalunya and the Spanish Ministry of Health, the festival was postponed to August 2020. The lineup for the 2021 edition was announced in May 2020. The lineup included most artists that were scheduled to play in 2020 as well as new additions, including Gorillaz, Doja Cat, FKA Twigs, Rina Sawayama and Charli XCX. In March 2021, the festival was rescheduled once again for the summer of 2022.

The definitive lineup was announced on 25 May 2021 through a promotional trailer sponsored by Seat Cupra starring María José Llergo. New headliners included Dua Lipa, Lorde, Nick Cave and the Bad Seeds, Megan Thee Stallion and Jorja Smith. The local artists catalogue included Alizzz, Amaia, Bad Gyal, La Zowi, Manel, María del Mar Bonet, Renaldo & Clara, Rigoberta Bandini, Sen Senra and Triángulo de Amor Bizarro among others. The lineup was constantly reinvented adding bookings of acts like Ride, Phoenix, Jhay Cortez or Grimes.

Headline set lists

First weekend

{{hidden
| headercss = color:#ffffff; background: #de1300; font-size: 100%; width: 100%;;
| contentcss = text-align: left; font-size: 100%; width: 100%;;
| header = Nick Cave & the Bad Seeds
| content =

"Get Ready for Love"
"There She Goes, My Beautiful World"
"From Her to Eternity"
"O Children"
"Jubilee Street"
"Bright Horses"
"I Need You"
"Waiting for You"
"Carnage"
"Tupelo"
"Red Right Hand"
"The Mercy Seat"
"The Ship Song"
"Higgs Boson Blues"
"City of Refuge"
"White Elephant"

Encore
"Into My Arms"
"Vortex"
"Ghosteen Speaks"
}}

{{hidden
| headercss = color:#ffffff; background: #de1300; font-size: 100%; width: 100%;;
| contentcss = text-align: left; font-size: 100%; width: 100%;;
| header = Tame Impala
| content =

"One More Year"
"Borderline"
"Nangs"
"Breathe Deeper"
"Elephant"
"Lost in Yesterday"
"Apocalypse Dreams"
"Let It Happen"
"Feels Like We Only Go Backwards"
"Eventually"
"Runway, Houses, City, Clouds"

Encore
"Last Nite"
"The Less I Know the Better"
"New Person, Same Old Mistakes"
}}

Second weekend

{{hidden
| headercss = color:#ffffff; background: #00590d; font-size: 100%; width: 100%;;
| contentcss = text-align: left; font-size: 100%; width: 100%;;
| header = The Strokes
| content =

"Bad Decisions"
"Hard to Explain"
"Selfless"
"Juicebox"
"Someday"
"Reptilia"
"The Adults Are Talking"
"You Only Live Once"
"Under Control"
"Take It or Leave It"
"Brooklyn Bridge to Chorus"
"New York City Cops"
"Under Cover of Darkness"

Encore
"Threat of Joy"
}}
{{hidden
| headercss = color:#ffffff; background: #00590d; font-size: 100%; width: 100%;;
| contentcss = text-align: left; font-size: 100%; width: 100%;;
| header = Tame Impala
| content =

"One More Year"
"Borderline"
"Nangs"
"Mind Mischief"
"Breathe Deeper"
"Elephant"
"The Moment"
"Apocalypse Dreams"
"Let It Happen"
"Feels Like We Only Go Backwards"
"Eventually"
"Runway, Houses, City, Clouds"

Encore
"The Less I Know the Better"
"New Person, Same Old Mistakes"
}}

{{hidden
| headercss = color:#ffffff; background: #00590d; font-size: 100%; width: 100%;;
| contentcss = text-align: left; font-size: 100%; width: 100%;;
| header = Yeah Yeah Yeahs
| content =

"Spitting Off the Edge of the World"
"Cheated Hearts"
"Pin"
"Under the Earth"
"Burning"
"Zero"
"Wolf"
"Soft Shock"
"Gold Lion"
"Maps"
"Y Control"
"Heads Will Roll"

Encore
"Date with the Night"
}}

Lineup
Headline performers are listed in boldface. Artists listed from latest to earliest set times.

Estrella Damm

Pull&Bear

Binance

Cupra

Plenitude

Ouigo

Tous

Dice

Night Pro

Boiler Room X Cupra

NTS

Estrella Damm Sona

Tous Sona

Jack Daniel's Sona

Auditori Rockdelux

Day Pro

Primavera a la Ciutat lineup

Bóveda

Day Pro

La [2] Apolo

La Nau

La Tèxtil

Laut

Paral.lel 62

Poble Espanyol

Razzmatazz

Razzmatazz 2

Red58

Sala Apolo

Sala Vol

Sidecar

UPLOAD

Brunch on the Beach lineup

Dice

Tous

Gallery

Cancelled acts
Afrikan Sciences
Bestia Bebé
Bikini Kill
Bleachers
Clairo
DJ Black Low
Georgia
girl in red
Holly Humberstone
Kehlani
King Princess
Lingua Ignota
Little Simz (5 June performance)
La Mafia del Amor
Massive Attack
Pa Salieu
PinkPantheress
Rapsody
Tainy
The Strokes (3 June performance)

References

Primavera Sound
2022 music festivals
Music festivals in Spain